"Paloma Negra" is a ranchera song written by Tomás Méndez and originally released by Chavela Vargas in 1961 on her self-titled debut album. The song was also featured on the soundtrack to the Academy Award-nominated biopic Frida.

"Paloma Negra" has been covered by other prominent artists such as Lola Beltrán, Vicente Fernández, Ángela Aguilar, Lila Downs, Rocio Jurado, Vikki Carr, Angélica Garcia, and Jenni Rivera.

References

Vicente Fernández songs
Jenni Rivera songs
Ranchera songs